The Hard Truth is a 1994 American action crime thriller film directed by Kristine Peterson and starring Eric Roberts, Michael Rooker and Lysette Anthony.

Premise
A recently suspended cop blackmails an electronics expert to help him steal $3 million from his girlfriend's boss, a corrupt councilman with ties to the mob.

Cast
Eric Roberts as Dr. Chandler Etheridge
Michael Rooker as Jonah Mantz
Lysette Anthony as Lisa Kantrell

Reception
David Rooney of Variety gave the film a negative review and wrote that it "provides few surprises but should prove serviceable enough as video fare".

Glenn Kenny of Entertainment Weekly graded the film a C- and wrote that director Peterson "pads The Hard Truth with pointless action scenes and sexual interludes that stretch this should-have-been-80-minutes trifle to 100".

References

External links
 
 

1994 films
1994 action thriller films
1994 crime thriller films
American thriller films
1990s English-language films
Films directed by Kristine Peterson
1990s American films